The Fédération étudiante universitaire du Québec (FEUQ) (in English  : University student federation of Quebec) was a federation of university students' unions created following the lifting of the tuition freeze in 1989. It included 9 member associations, which represent more than 71 000 Quebec university students. The organization was dissolved on April 23, 2019.

Member Associations at the time of Dissolution
 Association étudiante de l'école des sciences de la gestion (AéESG) (Université du Québec à Montréal).
 Association des étudiants des cycles supérieurs de Polytechnique inc. (AÉCSP) (École polytechnique de Montréal)
 Association des Étudiants de l’École Nationale d’Administration Publique (AEENAP) (École nationale d'administration publique)
 Association des Étudiants de Polytechnique (École polytechnique de Montréal)
 Association générale des étudiants et étudiantes de l'Institut Armand-Frappier (AGEIAF) (Institut Armand-Frappier)
 Association Générale Étudiante de l'UQAT (AGEUQAT) (Université du Québec en Abitibi-Témiscamingue)
 Concordia Student Union (CSU) (Concordia University)
 Fédération étudiante de l'Université de Sherbrooke (FEUS) (Université de Sherbrooke)
 Post-Graduate Students' Society (PGSS) (McGill University)

See also
Fédération étudiante collégiale du Québec, its former College counterpart
Association pour une solidarité syndicale étudiante
Table de concertation étudiante du Québec

References

External links

Quebec students' associations
Students' associations in Canada
Groups of students' unions
Student political organizations
Organizations based in Montreal